A by-election was held for the New South Wales Legislative Assembly electorate of Southern Highlands on 25 May 1996. The by-election was triggered by the resignation of the sitting member, former Premier of New South Wales John Fahey, who vacated the seat to contest the federal electorate of Macarthur at the 1996 Australian federal election.

On the same day, by-elections were held in the seats of Clarence, Orange, Pittwater and Strathfield.

Four of the five recontested seats were retained by the Liberal-National Coalition, with the exception of Clarence. In Southern Highlands, there was three-cornered-contest between coalition partners, the Liberal and  parties. Despite the Nationals candidate polling the highest number of first preference votes, the Liberal Party retained the seat with a swing of 8.00% against them on a two-candidate-preferred basis.

Results

John Fahey resigned to successfully contest the federal electorate of Macarthur.

See also
Electoral results for the district of Southern Highlands
List of New South Wales state by-elections

References

1996 elections in Australia
New South Wales state by-elections
1990s in New South Wales